Damian Gardiner (23 September 1968 – 10 September 2013) was an Irish equestrian. He competed in two events at the 1996 Summer Olympics. Gardiner died of esophageal cancer, aged 44.

References

External links
 

1968 births
2013 deaths
Irish male equestrians
Olympic equestrians of Ireland
Equestrians at the 1996 Summer Olympics
Place of birth missing
Deaths from esophageal cancer
20th-century Irish people
21st-century Irish people